Bridge whist or straight bridge is a card game popular in the early 20th century.  It was derived from  whist with the additional rules that the players would take turns as dummy and that the trump suit would be deliberately chosen (including the option not to have one) on each deal rather than random. Later variations of the game led to auction bridge and then contract bridge, which superseded the others. Bridge whist had similar rules to Russian whist of the time, and the earliest known set of rules for it, printed in 1886, refers to the game as Biritch, or Russian Whist.

See also
 History of contract bridge
 THE LAWS OF BRIDGE (1904)

References

20th-century card games
American card games
Contract bridge
Whist
Year of introduction missing